Jed Gillespie (born 4 August 1992) is an Australian rugby union player who played for the  in the Super Rugby competition.  His position of choice is prop.

Early life 

Jed played his early club football with the Epping Rams, playing both in the forward pack and the backline. He attended The Kings School, where he played in the school's First XV in 2010 and playing for the Australian Schoolboys team in the same year.

After the completion of his high school studies, Jed continued the Gillespie legacy at the Eastwood Rugby Club. At Eastwood, he quickly progressed through the colts program and into grade, where he won two Shute Shields in 2014 and 2015.

Jed is currently the Assistant Coach of Eastwood Rugby First Grade.

References 

Australian rugby union players
1992 births
Living people
Rugby union props
Greater Sydney Rams players
New South Wales Country Eagles players
Melbourne Rebels players